The Clover Leaf egg is a jewelled Easter egg made under the supervision of the Russian jeweller Peter Carl Fabergé in 1902 for Tsar Nicholas II of Russia. It was presented by Nicholas as an Easter gift to his wife, the Tsarina Alexandra Feodorovna. It is currently held in the Kremlin Armoury Museum in Moscow, and it is one of the few imperial Fabergé eggs that were never sold after the Russian Revolution.

Design
The Clover Leaf egg is made of an openwork pattern of stems and leaves of clover forming the shape of an egg. The gaps between the metal outline of the leaves are covered with transparent bright green enamel. A very thin golden ribbon paved with rubies curls through the foliage. At the time, the production of transparent enamel was still a new method, and often suffered from problems while cooling. There are no flaws in the enamel of the Clover Leaf Egg, but it is considered too fragile to travel.

Surprise
The surprise in the egg has been lost but according to archives it was a four-leaf clover with twenty-three diamonds, and four miniature portraits of the four daughters of the Tsar: Olga, Tatiana, Maria, and Anastasia.

See also
Egg decorating

References

Sources

External links

Description at wintraecken.nl

Imperial Fabergé eggs
1902 works
Fabergé in the Moscow Kremlin Museums